22 Long is a variety of 22 caliber (5.6 mm) rimfire ammunition.  The 22 Long is the second-oldest of the surviving rimfire cartridges, dating back to 1871, when it was loaded with a 29 grain (1.9 g) bullet and 5 grains (0.32 g) of black powder, 25% more than the 22 Short on which it was based.  It was designed for use in revolvers, but was soon chambered in rifles as well, in which it gained a strong reputation as a small game cartridge, and sold very well.

In 1887 the 22 Long case was combined with the heavier 40 grain (2.6 g) bullet of the 22 Extra Long of 1880 to produce the 22 Long Rifle giving a longer overall length, a higher muzzle energy and superior performance as a hunting and target round, rendering the 22 Long and 22 Extra Long obsolete. Many firearms designed for the 22 Long Rifle will chamber and fire the shorter round, though the 22 Long generally does not generate sufficient energy to operate semi-automatic guns.  The one prominent survivor of the 22 Long is the 22 CB Long, a long-cased version of the 22 CB.

While the original 22 Long loading used the same powder charge as the 22 Long Rifle, the 22 Long bullet was significantly lighter, and the combination did not result in higher velocities for the 22 Long when fired from a rifle.  The large barrel volume to chamber volume ratio of a 22 rimfire rifle means that the powder gasses have expanded as far as they can well before the bullet reaches the muzzle of a normal length rifle barrel, and the light 22 Long bullet has less inertia than the 22 Long Rifle.  This means that the 22 Long bullet actually slows down significantly before it exits the barrel.  For farmers, or for those who only hunted small game such as squirrel or cottontail rabbit, the differences in performance between the 22 Long and 22 Long Rifle cartridges were of little importance. The quieter report and lower penetration of the 22 Long cartridge were often seen as desirable qualities.

Since the 22 Long Rifle performs as well in a short handgun barrel as the 22 Long and outperforms it significantly in a long rifle barrel, the development of the 22 Long Rifle assured the 22 Long's path to obsolescence.

Descendants of the 22 Long still live on.  Modern Hypervelocity loadings of the 22 Long Rifle use bullets as light as 30 grains (1.9 g), and modern blends of powder to make full use of a rifle barrel to generate velocities far higher than normal loads, and chamber pressures high enough to cycle semi-automatic firearms reliably.  The most well known of these is the CCI Stinger, which actually goes so far as to stretch the case length slightly, so that with the short, light bullet, the overall length is still within the max overall length for the 22 Long Rifle.

The 22 Long is still produced as it survived the change over to smokeless powders. CCI currently loads a high-velocity 22 Long with a MV of 1215 fps and a ME of 95 ft. lbs.

Specifications
 Length:
 Case: 0.613 in (15.6mm)
 Overall: 0.888 in (22.6mm)
 Bullet weight: 29 gr (1.88 g)
 Twist: 1 in 20 for dedicated firearms

See also
 .22 BB
 .22 CB
 .22 Short
 .22 Extra Long
 .22 Long Rifle
 .22 Magnum
 .22 Hornet
 5 mm caliber
 List of rifle cartridges
 List of rimfire cartridges

References

1871 introductions
Pistol and rifle cartridges
Rimfire cartridges